Maxwell Price Muncy (born August 25, 2002) is an American professional baseball shortstop for the Oakland Athletics organization. He was selected in the first round of the 2021 Major League Baseball draft by the Athletics.

Early life and amateur career
Muncy grew up in Camarillo, California and attended Thousand Oaks High School. He made the varsity baseball team as a freshman and hit for .382 average with 13 extra-base hits as a sophomore. As a senior, Muncy batted .469 with 45 hits, 49 RBIs and 11 home runs, and scored 34 runs in 28 games played and was named the Baseball Player of the Year by the Los Angeles Times and Los Angeles Daily News. Muncy committed to play college baseball at the University of Arkansas.

Professional career
Muncy was selected 25th overall in the 2021 Major League Baseball draft by the Oakland Athletics. He signed with Oakland for a $2.85 million bonus.

Muncy made his professional debut with the Rookie-level Arizona Complex League Athletics, slashing .129/.206/.129 with four hits, 12 strikeouts, three walks, and four RBIs over 31 at-bats. He opened the 2022 season with the Stockton Ports of the Single-A California League. Muncy batted .230 with 16 doubles, 16 home runs, and 51 RBIs in 81 games with Stockton before being promoted to the Lansing Lugnuts of the High-A Midwest League.

References

External links

2002 births
Baseball players from California
Baseball shortstops
Living people
Arizona Complex League Athletics players
Stockton Ports players
Sportspeople from Ventura County, California
Lansing Lugnuts players